A presser foot is an attachment used with sewing machines to hold fabric flat as it is fed through the machine and stitched.  Sewing machines have feed dogs in the bed of the machine to provide traction and move the fabric as it is fed through the machine, while the sewer provides extra support for the fabric by guiding it with one hand. A presser foot keeps the fabric flat so that it does not rise and fall with the needle and pucker as it is stitched. When especially thick workpieces are to be sewn, such as quilts, a specialized attachment called a walking foot is often used rather than a presser foot.

Presser feet are typically spring-hinged to provide some flexibility as the workpiece moves beneath it. Presser feet have two toes, one to hold the fabric down on either side of the needle.

Types of presser feet

Shank
Different manufacturers have produced machines with one of three types of presser foot shank in mind.  These are the low shank, high shank, and the slant shank presser foot.  A low shank presser foot has a  distance from the bottom of the foot to the center of the thumbscrew; a high shank foot has a  distance; a slant shank foot is distinctly slanted.  The kind of foot a given machine requires is not interchangeable: a low-shank machine will only accept a low shank presser foot, and a high shank machine only a high-shank presser foot, though within these categories any low shank or high shank foot will fit any corresponding low shank or high shank machine; exceptionally, a slant shank foot can only be used with a Singer slant needle machine and no other (likewise, such a machine can accept no other kind of foot).

Feet
The most commonly used presser feet are the all-purpose foot and the zipper foot, which come standard with most household machines. However, an array of specialized feet have also been designed for a number of uses.  Among these are the following: 
binding foot, used to sew a long folded narrow strip of fabric that is wrapped around the edge of the workpiece
blind hem foot
button-attaching foot 
buttonhole foot
darning foot
fringe foot
gathering foot
invisible zipper foot
narrow hem foot called as well a rolled hem foot (comes in different sizes measured in mm of the hem)
open-toe foot
overedge/overcast foot
pintuck foot (comes in different sizes measured in the number of grooves)
piping/ cording foot
quarter-inch seam foot (6mm)
quilting quarter-inch seam foot
roller foot
satin stitch or decorative stitch foot
straight-stitch foot
tape attaching foot used for narrow ribbons, rick-rack, etc.

Most presser feet are made of steel or clear plastic; however, presser feet made of Teflon or other non-stick material are used for sewing with leather, plastic, vinyl and oilcloth.

References

Sewing machines